Cernak or Černák is a Slovak surname that may refer to
Erik Černák (born 1997), Slovak ice hockey defenseman 
Ibolja Cernak, Serbian medical scientist
Isaka Cernak (born 1989), Australian football player 
Ľudovít Černák (born 1951), Slovak politician and businessman
Peter Černák (born 1976), Slovak football player 
Roland Černák (born 1997), Slovak football midfielder

See also
Chernyak

Slovak-language surnames